Physics Wallah Private Limited (also known as Physics Wallah or PW) is an Indian educational technology company headquartered in Noida, Uttar Pradesh. It was founded by Alakh Pandey and Prateek Maheshwari in 2020 as a YouTube Channel. It is the 101st Unicorn company of India with a value of 8000 crore in rupees (1.1 Billion Dollars).

History 
Physics Wallah Private Limited, commonly known as "Physics Wallah" or "PW", was founded in 2016 as a YouTube Channel by Alakh Pandey, an educator hailing from Allahabad, Uttar Pradesh. Along with co-founder Prateek Maheshwari, Pandey developed an app specifically designed for students aspiring to take the National Eligibility cum Entrance Exam and Joint Entrance Exam in 2020. In addition, Physics Wallah launched courses for School Prep, JEE, NEET, GATE, SSC, UPSC, PSC, NDA, CA Foundation, CA Intermediate, CSIR NET, IIT JAM, MBA, NEET PG, and CUET.

As of January 2023, the Physics Wallah app has been downloaded more than 10 million times. Recently, the company entered the unicorn club with $100 million in funding.

Funding and financials 
In June 2022, Physics Wallah became India's 101st unicorn company by raising $100 million in its maiden funding round led by WestBridge Capital and GSV Ventures. During the same time, PW launched its first offline center named Vidyapeeth in Kota, Rajasthan. As of January 2023, Physics Wallah runs over 45 offline centers across 60 cities such as Delhi, Bhopal, Varanasi, Noida, Lucknow, Pune, Kolkata, Siliguri, Guwahati, Malda, Patna,  Ranchi and Srinagar

Acquisitions and expansions 
In August 2022, Physics Wallah acquired FreeCo, a doubt solving platform and marked it as their first acquisition. In October 2022, Prep Online and Altis Vortex both of which are focused on publishing books aimed at helping students prepare for various competitive exams were acquired. In December 2022, Physics Wallah acquired iNeuron with 100% stake from S. Chand.

In popular culture 
A 6-episode web series named Physics Wallah on the life of Alakh Pandey and his company was released on 14 December 2022 on Amazon Mini TV. Alakh Pandey, the series' protagonist, was portrayed by Shreedhar Dubey.

References

External links 

 Physics Wallah Official Website

Educational websites
Indian educational websites
Educational technology companies
Education companies of India
Indian companies established in 2020